Kärnjärv is a lake in the Estonian village of Paidra.

See also
List of lakes of Estonia

References

Lakes of Estonia
Võru Parish
Lakes of Võru County